Thy Catafalque is an avant-garde metal band formed in Makó, Hungary, later based in Edinburgh, Scotland, after the relocation of its founder.

History
The band was formed by Hungarian musician Tamás Kátai, along with a bandmate from a previous group, Gort. In their early years, the band started off as an "Avantgarde post-black metal project". As time progressed, the band left most of their traditional black metal influences behind for an "extreme variety of songs" in their 2004 album, Tűnő Idő Tárlat. In February 2009, the band was signed to the avant-garde independent record label Epidemie Records. They have had a number of guest musicians over the years, including vocals by Ágnes Tóth of neo-folk duo The Moon and the Nightspirit.

In 2009, they released their concept album Róka Hasa Rádió, about "the relationship between the ever evolving, solid and massive physical matter and the fragileness of humans and all living spirits, throughout distant childhood memories and scientific explanations of nature. Revolving, rotating movements of past and future, colours, sounds, long lost scents by a strange transmission from a timeless radio." It features a mix of atmospheric instrumental music, Hungarian folk elements and traditional black metal, making it very experimental. The album narrowly missed the winner's place in the 2009 HangSúly Hungarian Metal Awards, which was won by Dalriada.

In 2011 the band signed to Season Of Mist. Their fifth album entitled Rengeteg released in 2011 was the first Thy Catafalque album written and recorded by Tamás Kátai alone without János Juhász, who did not contribute to the recording this time.

Members
Current:
 Tamás Kátai – vocals, keyboards/synthesizers, guitar, bass guitar, programming

Past: 
 János Juhász – guitar, bass guitar (1998–2011)

Discography

Albums
 Sublunary Tragedies (1999)
 Microcosmos (2001)
 Tűnő Idő Tárlat (2004)
 Róka Hasa Rádió (2009)
 Rengeteg (2011)
 Sgùrr (2015)
 Meta (2016)
 Geometria (2018)
 Naiv (2020)
 Vadak (2021)

Demos
 Cor Cordium (1999)

References

External links
 Official website
 Season Of Mist
 Thy Catafalque info sheet at Metal-archives
 Thy Catafalque on Myspace

Avant-garde metal musical groups
Hungarian black metal musical groups
Hungarian heavy metal musical groups
Symphonic black metal musical groups
Musical groups established in 1998
Hungarian musical duos
Season of Mist artists